The Holden Colorado utility vehicle and similar Holden Colorado 7 sport utility vehicle (SUV) were sold in Australasia by Holden. Introduced in 2008 to replace the Holden Rodeo the Australasian Colorado was built by GM Thailand and is essentially a rebadged version of the facelifted Thai-specification Colorado, retaining its front styling which differed from the American-market equivalent Chevrolet Colorado. The Colorado was sold alongside the almost identical Isuzu D-Max, also released in 2008.

The second-generation Holden Colorado was revealed at the 2011 Australian International Motor Show and went on sale in June 2012 in both Australia and New Zealand, also sourced from the Rayong factory in Thailand. Only one engine is offered, the 2.8 L turbo diesel, built by GM Thailand. In order from lowest to highest, trims include the LS, LT, LSX, LTZ, LTZ+ and Z71 for the 2020 model year. The LS and LT are basic trims, LSX and Z71 are designed with a focus on off-roading, LTZ and LTZ+ are designed with a focus on luxury. LT is only available as a RWD, LSX, LTZ+ and Z71 are only available as 4WD.

The Brazilian-built Chevrolet S-10 dual-cab became the 2017 facelifted model. The Colorado and Colorado 7, the latter rebadged as Chevrolet Trailblazer SUV in 2017, were made at the GM Thailand plant for both the Asian and Australasian markets Both were discontinued in 2020 due to the demise of Holden brand and the closure of GM Thailand plant.

References

Colorado
Cars introduced in 2008